The following lists events that happened during 2012 in Brunei.

Events

July
 July 21 - A helicopter carrying military personnel crashes killing 12 people.

References

 
Years of the 21st century in Brunei
2010s in Brunei
Brunei
Brunei